BC Fourteen (born December 2, 1972) is an American screenwriter, novelist, film director and editor. He began his career with a slate of award-winning short films and music videos, and has written commercially for the page and screen under numerous pseudonyms.

Fourteen has scripted various feature animation franchises under the pen name Christopher Maitland, in homage to the Peter Cushing character in 1965's The Skull.

Partial filmography
Do Not Disturb (as BC Furtney) (2013, originally released as New Terminal Hotel)
Werewolf Rising (as BC Furtney) (2014)
One Nation Under Trump (as BC Furtney) (2016)
Trumpocalypse Now! (as BC Furtney) (2017)
Uncivil War: Battle for America (as BC Furtney) (2017)
Go Big Or Go Home (as BC Furtney) (2018)
The Lost Lion Kingdom (as BC Furtney) (2019)
Jumbo (as BC Furtney) (2019)
Ogre (as BC Furtney) (2019)
Lil' Monsters (2019)
Dia of the Dead (2019)
The Halloween Family (2019)
April Fool's Fright (as Christopher Maitland) (2020)
Patrick (as Christopher Maitland) (2020)
Hopz (as Christopher Maitland) (2020)
00K9 (as Christopher Maitland) (2020)
The Lion Kid 2 (as Christopher Maitland) (2020)
Hodge Saves Easter (as Christopher Maitland) (2020)
Spaced Cats (2020)
Trump Vs. The Illuminati (2020)
Bigfoot Vs. The Illuminati (2020)
00K9: No Time To Shed (as Christopher Maitland) (2021)
Bigfoot Vs. Megalodon (2021)
Tickles The Clown (2021)
Bigfoot Vs. Krampus (2021)
Manson & Dracula: Closer Than We Think (2022)
Van Helsing (2023)
Xterminator and the AI Apocalypse (2023)
Bigfoot Vs. Megalodon 2 (2023)
The Dead Window (2023)
Bundy & The Wolf Man: Closer Than We Think (2023)

Partial bibliography
Scarla (2011)
Pilar's Penetration (as Alicia Collar) (2011)
The Warden's Daughter (as Sadie Masters) (2011)
Maimstream (2013)
You, Me, and the Devil Makes Three (2013)
Bought by Edward Steel (as Alicia Collar) (2013)
Sold by Edward Steel (as Alicia Collar) (2013)
Returned to Edward Steel (as Alicia Collar) (2013)
Shared by the Sheik (as Sadie Masters) (2013)
Big Red's Big Win (as Sadie Masters) (2013)
Train to Submission (as Tyra Knots) (2013)
Insatiable (as Fiona Foxx) (2013)
Bloodsucker! (2016)

Short films
Mister Eryams (as BC Furtney) (2004)
Perfect (as BC Furtney) (2004)
Disposer (as BC Furtney) (2004)
Culinary Art (as BC Furtney) (2005)
Voices (as BC Furtney) (2005)
The Hunter and the Hunted (aka Babe in the Woods) (2021)
The Dirty Hands Man (screenplay by) (2021)

References

External links

1972 births
Living people
Film directors from Pennsylvania
Novelists from Pennsylvania
21st-century American novelists
21st-century American male writers